Firswood is a suburban area of Stretford in the Metropolitan Borough of Trafford, Greater Manchester, England.

Geography
Firswood borders Whalley Range, Old Trafford and Chorlton-cum-Hardy. It was largely occupied by Rye Bank Farm, which remained until 1930, when private housing was built along Rye Bank Road and Warwick Road. The neighbouring Firs Farm was demolished in 1960, and social housing built on the site. Before being drained, the area was largely a peat bog, which explains the lack of development before the 20th century.

The oldest residential part of the area is Darley Park, which shares some characteristics with neighbouring Whalley Range and Chorltonville.

St Teresa's church (1928) is a parish church in the Roman Catholic Diocese of Salford.

Landmarks

The Quadrant
The Quadrant, where Kings Road meets Great Stone Road is the most recognisable place in the area. In the centre are public gardens and parking,  Around this leafy green space is the Quadrant public house, a former public library now a Beacon Centre, and a number of shops, a barber and an established Holistic Therapy Centre .

Transport
Firswood is served by the Manchester Metrolink light rail network. Firswood tram stop is on Rye Bank Road, where it opened in July 2011, after the existing disused Cheshire Lines Committee railway track was cleared and upgraded as part of Metrolink ‘Big Bang' extension.

The tram stop is served by two lines: Rochdale to East Didsbury, and Cornbrook to Manchester Airport. This means there are direct services from Firswood to Manchester city centre, Rochdale, Oldham, Chorlton, Didsbury, Wythenshawe and Manchester Airport.

The area is also served by the nearby Old Trafford tram stop, on the Altrincham to Bury line, and the number 15 bus.

Public services
Stretford Memorial Hospital, originally known as Basford House, was converted into a cottage hospital as a memorial to those who lost their lives in the First World War. On opening it had a children's ward, a maternity unity and a geriatric ward. Until its closure in October 2015, it was managed by Central Manchester University Hospitals NHS Foundation Trust, and provided a range of services including geriatric medicine, ophthalmology and pain management.

Notable residents
John Alcock, who along with Arthur Whitten Brown was the first man to fly across the Atlantic Ocean, was born in the lodge of Basford House on Seymour Grove, where his father was the coachman.

Edward Colquhoun Charlton lived at 12 Basford Road, prior to his conscription into the British Army.  He was posthumously awarded the last Victoria Cross awarded in the European theatre of the Second World War.  A road was subsequently named after him, on the nearby Firs Farm development.

References

Bibliography

External links
Metrolink South Manchester line
Travel by tram
Travel by tram

Geography of Trafford
Areas of Greater Manchester
Stretford